Eremias vermiculata (commonly known as the Central Asian racerunner or variegated racerunner ) is a species of lizard found in Mongolia, China, and Kazakhstan. Eremias velox is also sometimes known as the Central Asian racerunner.

References

Eremias
Reptiles described in 1875
Reptiles of Mongolia
Reptiles of China
Reptiles of Central Asia
Taxa named by William Thomas Blanford